Khaisilk is the brand name of many fashion shops, coffee shops, restaurants, and resorts in Vietnam. Khaisilk's members mainly operate in Hà Nội, Hội An, Đà Lạt and Hồ Chí Minh City (Saigon).

A popular location is Nam Kha Restaurant, a high-end Vietnamese cuisine restaurant. It is located on Đồng Khởi street in Hồ Chí Minh City.

Made in China scandal
According to Vietnam’s Law on Consumer Protection, Khai Silk has violated several regulations including Origin and Counterfeit goods by putting “Made in Vietnam” tags onto Chinese- made products and changing the ingredient. Further, The Ministry of Industry and Trade (“MOIT”) announced that it had completed product quality check-ups some silk items of Khai Duc Company Limited – the owner of the Khai Silk brand. The inspection results showed that there was no silk ingredient in some products, despite the label of ingredients stating that the product is 100% silk.

References

Clothing companies of Vietnam
Vietnamese brands
Companies based in Ho Chi Minh City